Nancy Erickson is an American political aide who served as the 32nd Secretary of the United States Senate from 2007 to 2015. She began her term as Secretary on January 4, 2007, in the 110th Congress. Erickson was appointed by Democratic and Majority Leader Harry Reid of Nevada.

Early life and education 
A native of Brandon, South Dakota, Erickson earned a Bachelor of Arts from Augustana University and a Master of Arts from American University.

Career 
Prior to serving as Secretary of the Senate, Erickson served as the Democratic Representative to the Sergeant at Arms. She also served as the deputy chief of staff to former Senate majority leader Tom Daschle.

On January 6, 2009, Erickson rejected Roland Burris's request to be seated as the junior U.S. senator from Illinois. She stated that his credentials were incomplete because they were not signed by the Illinois Secretary of State, Jesse White. White refused to sign because the appointment was made by Illinois Governor Rod Blagojevich, who was charged in a corruption scandal with seeking to personally gain from the appointment.

Personal life 
Erickson is married to Thomas J. Erickson, an attorney who served as a Commissioner of the Commodity Futures Trading Commission from 1999 to 2004.

References

Year of birth missing (living people)
Living people
Augustana University alumni
American University alumni
Secretaries of the United States Senate

People from Brandon, South Dakota